Hide and Seek (stylized as HIDE and SEEK) is the third extended play by South Korean girl group Weki Meki. It was released on June 18, 2020, by Fantagio Music and distributed by Kakao M. It consists of five tracks, including the previously released singles "Dazzle Dazzle" and "Oopsy".

Release 
The EP was released on June 18, 2020, through several music portals, including MelOn and Apple Music.

Commercial performance 
The EP debuted and peaked at number 13 on the Gaon Album Chart for the week ending June 20, 2020. In its second week, the album fell to number 53 and climb to number 41 in its third week and to number 28 in its fourth week. The EP placed within the Top 100 for five consecutive weeks.

Hide and Seek was the 41st best-selling album in June 2020 with 12,759 copies sold. It has sold 16,848 copies as of July 2020.

Track listing

Charts

References 

2020 EPs
K-pop EPs
Dance-pop EPs
Hip hop EPs
Weki Meki EPs